Eagle Pass (el. 7,464 ft/2,275 m) is a high mountain pass in Lake County, Montana in the United States.

It is called nšt̓ew̓s sx̣ʷcusi in Salish, or "Standing in Middle" because a pillar of rock stands in the middle of the pass.

References

External links 
Eagle Pass, Montana Hometown Locator

Mountain passes of Montana
Landforms of Lake County, Montana